My Kitchen Rules (often abbreviated as MKR) is an Australian competitive cooking game show broadcast on the Seven Network since 2010. The show is currently hosted and judged by chef Manu Feildel, who has appeared in every season of the show. Fellow chef Pete Evans co-hosted until his departure after season 11, following controversy about his personal views and social media posts. Other celebrity chefs and food critics frequently appear as guest judges or mentors in the kitchen. The series was originally produced by the team who created the Seven reality show My Restaurant Rules, and was put into production based on the success of Network 10's MasterChef Australia.

For many years, the program performed strongly in the ratings and was regularly one of the highest rated programs on Australian television, with the finales of each season consistently ranking amongst the top 10 highest rated programs of the year. However ratings declined notably during season 10 in 2019, and with further significant declines for season 11 in 2020, commentators speculated that 2020 would be its final season.

Seven did not renew the series at their annual upfronts in October 2020, but suggested the show may return in future. During Seven’s annual upfronts, the series was confirmed to return for a twelfth season in 2022. In December 2021, Feildel was announced to be returning as a judge. In April 2022, it was announced Nigella Lawson and Matt Preston will be joining the series as judges alongside Feildel with Colin Fassnidge, Gary Mehigan and Curtis Stone appearing as guest judges. In October 2022, the series was renewed for a 13th season which will air in 2023.

Format

Contestants
The Australian show initially had teams of two contestants with pre-existing relationships—from New South Wales, Queensland, South Australia, Victoria and Western Australia—competing against each other to "transform an ordinary home into an instant restaurant complete with theme and table decorations for one pressure-cooker night." From 2011, the number of competitors grew as teams from Tasmania joined the show. A team from New Zealand took part only in the third season. In the fourth season, there were fifteen teams made up of two teams from each state, plus three additional teams—the gatecrashers—from New South Wales, Victoria and Western Australia. Season 5 introduced a team from the Australian Capital Territory, whilst season 11 marks the first time that there was not a team from South Australia.

Judging panel

 Series Judges – Celebrity chef Manu Feildel has appeared in every season in the show. Pete Evans appeared alongside Feidel until season 11; they have been responsible for all challenges and judging across the series. For season 12, Matt Preston joined the series as a judge, with Nigella Lawson appearing alongside Feildel early in the season.

Colin Fassnidge (Judge) – Making his first appearance as a guest judge in season 4, Colin joined the blind tasting panel for Sudden Death cook-offs. He was also involved with additional judging roles such as facilitating the Comeback Kitchen and Food Truck challenges in seasons 4 and 5 respectively. In seasons 6 and 7, Colin and Manu had rotated roles for judging. Colin was present for People's Choice and off-site challenges, while Manu was involved in Headquarters challenges. Colin was also featured for the first time in an Instant Restaurant round in the same season.

Blind Tasting Panel – During Sudden Death cook-off eliminations, the blind tasting panel are asked to score and judge the competing teams' meals. This panel currently consists of Liz Egan, Guy Grossi, Karen Martini and Colin Fassnidge. Previously it also included Jacqui Gowan in season 1 only and Tobie Puttock until season 3. From season 1 to 3, the panel had knowledge of which teams were cooking. From season 4, as a blind tasting panel, they do not know who the competing teams were until scoring.

 Guest Judges – Season 7 introduced new special guest judges who appeared in specific challenges alongside the main series panel. They included Rachel Khoo during Round 3 of the Instant restaurants and Curtis Stone during the first Kitchen HQ challenge. In season 8, Darren Robertson was included in an instant restaurant round.

Original format
Applicable only during the first season, the show followed a sudden death format—where two teams will cook a three-course meal and the losing team will immediately be eliminated from winning the competition.
 Initially participating teams are split into two groups of five to compete in a separate round of instant restaurant.
 A team who placed last (fifth place) in each instant restaurant group will be eliminated from the competition. However, teams who placed third and fourth will compete in a cook-off, and the two lowest scoring teams will be eliminated.
 After the cook-off, the remaining six teams competed in quarterfinal of three rounds, wherein:
 #2 teams in both instant restaurant groups competed in first quarterfinal round;
 #1 team in the first instant restaurant and #1 team in cook-off competed in second quarterfinal round; and
 #1 team in the second instant restaurant and #2 team in cook-off contended in last quarterfinal round.
 Losing teams of each quarterfinal rounds were immediately eliminated. However, the overall highest scoring team in quarterfinals advanced straight through the grand final. The remaining two teams contended in a semifinal, the last berth to the finale round.

Pre-2020 format

Instant restaurant round
Each episode focuses on one team's day of cooking, setting up their instant restaurant and serving a three-course dinner—entrée, main, and dessert—for the judges and their opposing teams. Teams could only start cooking three hours before the other teams and judges arrive at their house. After the team served all three meals to the judges and their opposition, each opposing team must rate the total meal out of ten, then each main judge must rate each of the three courses separately out of ten. The lowest scoring team will be then at risk of elimination.

Contestants do not necessarily cook in their own homes, for example in third season, eight of the twelve couples did not use their own kitchens mainly due to their homes being too small to accommodate the production. In most cases when this happened it is the home of a family member or friend or a holiday home of one or both members of the team.

 Team progress and eliminations:
There were variations on format in team progress and elimination process in this round.
 During the first season of the show, the lowest scoring teams (fifth place) of each instant restaurant round were eliminated immediately from the competition. Meanwhile, top two scoring teams on both rounds advanced through to quarterfinals round. Teams placing third and fourth on both instant restaurant rounds have to compete in a Kitchen Cook-off, where two losing teams will be eliminated and the other two will proceed through to quarterfinals.
 On the second season, the lowest scoring teams of each instant restaurant round competed in a Sudden Death cook-off, wherein the losing team was eliminated from the competition. The remaining teams advanced to the People's Choice Challenge—a new competition format replacing quarterfinals round.
 During the third season, the three lowest scoring teams of each instant restaurant round competed in yet another instant restaurant, thus having three rounds for this season. The losing team of the third instant restaurant was eliminated from the competition.
 During the fourth and fifth seasons, there were two rounds of instant restaurant with six teams each, wherein the lowest scoring team of each group was immediately eliminated from the competition. However, after the second round, the tally of the instant restaurant scores for both groups were combined and the three lowest scorers out of the remaining ten teams competed in another instant restaurant round with new set of teams—titled as the gatecrashers. The losing team of the third round was also eliminated from the competition.
 During the sixth season, after the first two groups had completed their rounds, a third instant restaurant group were introduced as 'Colin's secret round'. In that round, Colin Fassnidge is the only judge critiquing that group and is also the first time ever in the show, where Pete and Manu do not make an appearance as hosts. The lowest scoring teams from each of the three groups is eliminated. Then the bottom 2 teams from each group competed in an Instant Restaurant Redemption round to eliminate two more teams.

Pre-finals round
After the instant restaurants, the remaining teams compete in various challenges, either off-site or at Kitchen headquarters. Teams who cook the best dishes or receive the most votes/money can win People's Choice or Judge's Choice and are given advantages or are guaranteed safety from eliminations. Teams that fail to impress and receive poor reviews from the judges end up in a Sudden Death elimination.
 People's Choice Challenge – During this offsite challenge, teams all have an hour and a half to prepare their dishes relating to a theme or event. The team with the most guest votes (sometimes, the best-selling dish if all are tasked to sell their meal) is declared as the People's Choice and will be safe for the rest of the round or from the next elimination.
Food Truck – Used only in season 5 (2014), during the rounds from Top 12 to Top 9, remaining teams from the People's Choice will compete in a new Food Truck challenge. This sees teams split into two even groups (dependent on the number of teams remaining in the competition) and will each run competing restaurants, cooking in a large semi-trailer which opens up into two kitchens. Patrons dining will pay for what they believe the meal was worth. To win, the group must earn the most money. The losing group will continue onto the rapid cook-off, whilst the winning group, become safe from elimination and formed as the team's jury.
 Rapid Cook-off – In Kitchen Headquarters, teams are challenged to create a dish using a key ingredient in 30 minutes. All teams will be reviewed by the judges with certain number of teams who will be safe from elimination, and who will be competing in a following showdown. In season 5, dishes were not only judged by Pete and Manu, but also by a teams' jury, which is formed by all teams currently safe for the round. They were able to select one of teams to be safe.
 Showdown – Teams with the worst dishes during rapid cook-off compete in this round by cooking a meal using a core ingredient in 60 minutes. A team with the worst dish, again, will be chosen by the judges and will proceed straight through the Sudden Death round.
 Sudden Death – Two losing teams from challenges battle it out by producing a three-course meal for Pete and Manu, and the four guest judges. Both teams must prepare their dishes in a total of three hours – They have 90 minutes to do prep. and serve an entree, 60 minutes for their main course, and 30 minutes for the dessert. Each judge critiques and scores the total meal out of ten, and the lowest scoring team is eliminated from the competition. From the fourth season, blind tastings were introduced and the guest judges critiqued the dishes without knowing which team cooked it.

Finals round
Finals round consists of three rounds: two sets of semifinals, and a grand final. All follow a sudden death cook-off format where teams produce a three-course meal for the main judges and for the four guest judges. Teams' meals are scored out of ten by the judges and the lower scoring team is eliminated.

Semifinals
Prior to the grand final round, four remaining teams compete in a semifinal round. Teams going head-to-head in this round is determined variously in different seasons.
 In the 2011 season, there were four knives on a table, two of which had Semifinal 1 on their labels, and the other two had Semifinal 2 on their blades. The labels were covered, leaving the knife handles visible. Each team was asked to select a knife. Teams which picked Semifinal 1 knives competed in the first semifinal, while teams which chose Semifinal 2 contested the second semifinal.
 In the 2012 season, teams competed in a seeding round. Teams competed in two challenges, and their dishes on each challenge were scored out of ten by the judges. The highest scoring team (#1) of the seeding round cooked against the lowest scoring team (#4) in the first semifinal, while #2 and #3 teams competed in the second semifinal.
 In the 2013 and 2014 season, the final four teams were divided into two semifinal match-ups based on their rankings in the Final 5 round. As in 2012, #1 cooked against #4, and #2 cooked against #3.

Grand final
Winners of each semifinal go straight through the grand final round, the last stage of the competition. Each team's meal is scored and the higher scoring team is declared My Kitchen Rules champion.

Prize Money

From the first to the 10th series, the prize money was $250,000, however  the prize money was reduced in the 11th season to $100,000.

Series overview
 Colour legend:
 – Winner
 – Runner-up

International versions

Canada
From 2010–2013, a Québec's version of MKR was broadcast on Casa and TVA for 3 seasons, under the title of Ça va chauffer! with chefs Jonathan Garnier and Mathieu Cloutier.

Dinner Party Wars, was hosted/ judged by Corbin Tomaszeski (Canadian chef) and Anthea Turner (UK style and etiquette expert). The show had two seasons in 2017, based in Toronto, Ontario. Shown on Food Network Canada.

Israel
The show is produced in Israel by July August Productions for Keshet Media Group in October 2018, and is broadcast on its television channel Keshet 12, under the title of MKR The Winning Kitchen (Hebrew: MKR Hamitbakh HaMenatze'akh).

New Zealand
My Kitchen Rules NZ debuted in 2014 on TVNZ 1.
The first season ended in October 2014, won by Waikato's Neena and Belinda. The second season ended in December 2015 and was won by Wellington's Jess and Stella. The third season began on 25 September 2017, hosted by Pete Evans and Manu Feildel

Russia
A Russian version of MKR is broadcast on TV channel SONY SET TV. 10 seasons were shown.

Serbia
In Serbia, local production company Emotion Production purchased the format rights. The show is called Moja kuhinja, Moja pravila. The first series premiered in 2014 on B92.

South Africa
My Kitchen Rules SA premiered in South Africa on M-Net in 2017.

United Kingdom

Following the show's national and international ratings success in 2013, broadcaster Sky Living purchased the format rights to My Kitchen Rules for a United Kingdom version. The British franchise debuted on 25 January 2014, hosted by cook and author Lorraine Pascale and chef Jason Atherton.

A second British series aired on Channel 4 in September 2016, made up of 30-hour-long episodes, hosted by Prue Leith and Michael Caines and produced by 7 Wonder Productions, offering a £10,000 prize.

United States

In 2012, US-based production company Kinetic Content acquired the format rights for an American version of the show during the MIPTV Media Market event in Cannes, France. U.S. TV network Fox has ordered 8 episodes of MKR featuring celebrities in their Hollywood homes with Curtis Stone & Cat Cora as series co-judges.

Awards and nominations
The reality program has received nominations on the following awards:

Ratings and viewership average
Seasonal television ratings on aggregate figures for My Kitchen Rules on free-to-air Seven Network channel were gathered from TV Tonight covering only the five city metro across Australia, namely: Adelaide, Brisbane, Melbourne, Perth, and Sydney. The number of viewers presented in the table below are in millions.

Criticism
Season 5 was criticised by angry viewers who set up a Facebook page to boycott the finale as they claimed the runner-up team "bullied other teams." The show faced continued accusations of promoting bullying behaviour in subsequent seasons. In season 9, a team was dismissed from the show for their antagonistic behaviour towards other contestants and for getting into a physical altercation with another team off-camera; the incident has been blamed as one of the reasons behind the show's drop in viewership in later seasons. In April 2021, Seven was ordered to pay former season 10 contestant Piper O'Neill workers' compensation for “psychological injury” she suffered from her time on the show due to "vilification and bullying from producers and the network."

Later seasons were also criticised by long-time viewers who lamented the show shifting to focus more on interpersonal drama instead of cooking. During his tenure, the show also faced viewer consternation with the negative press garnered by former judge Pete Evans for his controversial lifestyle and dieting views that were sometimes at odds with the program.

International broadcast

See also
 MasterChef Australia
 Come Dine with Me Australia

References

External links
 
 

 
2010 Australian television series debuts
2010s Australian reality television series
2020s Australian reality television series
Australian cooking television series
Cooking competitions in Australia
English-language television shows
Food reality television series
Seven Network original programming
Television series by Seven Productions
Television shows set in Melbourne
Television shows set in Sydney